Emmett Evan "Van" Heflin Jr. (December 13, 1908 – July 23, 1971) was an American theatre, radio, and film actor. He played mostly character parts over the course of his film career, but during the 1940s had a string of roles as a leading man. Heflin won the Academy Award for Best Supporting Actor for his performance in Johnny Eager (1942). He also had memorable roles in Westerns such as Shane (1953), 3:10 to Yuma (1957), and Gunman's Walk (1958).

Early life
Heflin was born in Walters, Oklahoma, the son of Fanny Bleecker (née Shippey) and Dr. Emmett Evan Heflin, a dentist. He was of Irish and French ancestry. Heflin's sister was Daytime Emmy-nominated actress Frances Heflin (who married composer Sol Kaplan). Heflin attended Classen High School in Oklahoma City. One source says Long Beach Polytechnic High School. He also went to the University of Oklahoma, where he received a bachelor's degree in 1932 and was a member of Phi Delta Theta fraternity. He earned a master's degree in theater at Yale University. He was an accomplished seaman prior to his acting career and was in the military service during WWll.

Career

Broadway
Heflin began his acting career on Broadway in the late 1920s. He appeared in Mr. Moneypenny (1928), The Bride of Torozko (1934), The Night Remembers (1934), Mid-West (1936), and End of Summer (1936). The latter had a decent run and led to him being signed to a film contract by RKO Radio Pictures.

RKO
Heflin made his film debut in A Woman Rebels (1936), opposite Katharine Hepburn, whom he played opposite in the stage version of The Philadelphia Story. He followed it with The Outcasts of Poker Flat (1937), billed third after Preston Foster and Jean Muir, and Flight from Glory (1937), a Chester Morris programmer where Heflin played an alcoholic pilot.

Heflin was in Annapolis Salute (1937), then was given his first lead role in Saturday's Heroes (1937), playing a star quarterback.

Heflin returned to Broadway for Western Waters (1937–38) and Casey Jones (1938), the latter for the Group Theatre and directed by Elia Kazan.

In Hollywood Heflin had a support role in Back Door to Heaven (1939). He returned to Broadway where he played Macaulay Connor opposite Katharine Hepburn, Joseph Cotten and Shirley Booth in The Philadelphia Story, which ran for 417 performances from 1939–1940. It led to Heflin being offered a choice character part in the Errol Flynn western Santa Fe Trail (1940) at Warners, playing a villainous gun seller. The movie was a big hit. It also led to a contract offer from MGM.

MGM

MGM initially cast Heflin in supporting roles in films such as The Feminine Touch (1941) and H.M. Pulham, Esq. (1941).

He had an excellent part as Robert Taylor's doomed best friend in Johnny Eager (1942), which won Heflin an Academy Award for Best Supporting Actor, and was a box office success.

Stardom

MGM began to groom Heflin as a leading man in B movies, giving him the star role in Kid Glove Killer (1942), directed by Fred Zinnemann, and Grand Central Murder (1942). Both were popular.

Encouraged, MGM cast him as Kathryn Grayson's love interest in a musical, Seven Sweethearts (1942), then was given the star role in an "A" film, as the embattled President Andrew Johnson in Tennessee Johnson (1942), playing opposite (and at odds with) Lionel Barrymore who, in the role of Congressman Thaddeus Stevens, failed to have Johnson convicted in an impeachment trial by the slimmest of margins. The film was a box office flop.

Heflin was Judy Garland's love interest in Presenting Lily Mars (1943), then he enlisted in the army.

Heflin served during World War II in the United States Army Air Force as a combat cameraman in the Ninth Air Force in Europe and with the First Motion Picture Unit. He appeared in a training film, Land and Live in the Jungle (1944).

When Helfin returned to Hollywood, MGM lent him to Hal Wallis to appear opposite Barbara Stanwyck in The Strange Love of Martha Ivers (1946). He was in the all-star musical Till the Clouds Roll By (1946) then was loaned to Warner Bros to co star with Joan Crawford in Possessed (1947).

Back at MGM he co-starred with Lana Turner in Green Dolphin Street (1947), a big prestige film for the studio and their biggest hit of 1947. He was reunited with Stanwyck in B.F.'s Daughter (1948) and was loaned to Walter Wanger for Tap Roots (1948), where he was top billed; both lost money.

MGM cast him as Athos in The Three Musketeers (1948), a huge success. He was top-billed in Zinnemann's Act of Violence (1949), and supported Jennifer Jones in Madame Bovary (1949). Both movies were acclaimed but lost money. He then made a third film with Stanwyck, East Side, West Side (1950), but he was now billed beneath James Mason. While that production did not lose money, it only netted a small profit for the studio.

Radio
The Adventures of Philip Marlowe was a radio detective drama that aired from June 17, 1947, through September 15, 1951, first heard on NBC in the summer of 1947 starring Van Heflin (June 12, 1947 – September 9, 1947). He also acted on the Lux Radio Theatre, Suspense, Cavalcade of America and many more radio programs.

Leaving MGM
Heflin began appearing on television on episodes of Nash Airflyte Theatre and Robert Montgomery Presents (an adaptation of Arrowsmith).

Heflin had the lead role in a Western at Universal, Tomahawk (1951) and starred in a thriller directed by Joseph Losey, The Prowler (1951).

At Universal he made a family comedy with Patricia Neal, Week-End with Father (1951), then he was an FBI man in Leo McCarey's anti-Communist My Son John (1952).

Heflin went to England to star in South of Algiers (1953). He appeared in a huge success as the honest farmer in Shane (1953) with Alan Ladd.

However he followed it up with action films at Universal: Wings of the Hawk (1953), and Tanganyika (1954). He starred in an independent Western, The Raid (1954) and was one of many stars in 20th Century Fox's Woman's World (1954).

Heflin stayed at Fox to star in Black Widow (1954) and he was top billed in Warners' Battle Cry (1955) based on Leon Uris's best seller which was a major hit at the box office.

After a Western, Count Three and Pray (1955), Heflin starred in Patterns (1956) based on a TV play by Rod Serling. He also did a Playhouse 90 written by Serling, "The Dark Side of the Earth", and "The Rank and File"; he also did "The Cruel Day" by Reginald Rose.

Heflin returned to Broadway to appear in a double bill of Arthur Miller's A View From the Bridge and A Memory of Two Mondays which ran for 149 performances under the direction of Martin Ritt.

Heflin had an excellent part in 3:10 to Yuma (1957) with Glenn Ford. He made a Western with Tab Hunter, his old Battle Cry co star, Gunman's Walk (1958). That was made for Columbia, with whom Heflin signed a contract to make one film a year for five years.

Europe
Heflin then went to Italy to star in Tempest (1959). He was billed after Gary Cooper and Rita Hayworth in They Came to Cordura (1959).

Heflin went back to Europe for 5 Branded Women (1960), which he starred in for Martin Ritt, Under Ten Flags (1960), and The Wastrel (1961). In Hollywood he appeared on The Dick Powell Theatre.

Heflin went to the Philippines to star in a war film Cry of Battle (1963). This was playing at the Texas Theatre in Dallas on November 22, 1963. His name and the film title appear on the marquee. It was that theatre where Lee Harvey Oswald was apprehended in the aftermath of President Kennedy's assassination.

Heflin had another Broadway hit in the title role of A Case of Libel (1963–64) which ran for 242 performances.

Later career
Heflin appeared in a short but dramatic role as an eyewitness of Jesus' raising of Lazarus from death in the 1965 Bible film, The Greatest Story Ever Told. After seeing the miracle he ran from Bethany to the walls of Jerusalem and proclaimed to the guards at the top of the wall that Jesus was the Messiah.

Heflin returned to MGM for a support part in Once a Thief (1965). He was in the remake of Stagecoach (1966) and went to Europe to star in The Man Outside (1967) and Every Man for Himself (1968).

In the US he was in the TV movies A Case of Libel (1968), and Certain Honorable Men (1968) and he had a support part in The Big Bounce (1969).

Heflin's last feature film was Airport (1970). He played "D. O. Guerrero", a failure who schemes to blow himself up on an airliner so that his wife (played by Maureen Stapleton) can collect on a life insurance policy. It was an enormous success.

His last TV movies were Neither Are We Enemies (1970) and The Last Child (1971).

Personal life
Heflin had a six-month marriage to actress Eleanor Shaw (née Eleanor Scherr, died 2004) in the mid-thirties. In 1942,  Heflin married RKO contract player Frances Neal. They had two daughters, actresses Vana O'Brien and Cathleen (Kate) Heflin, and a son, Tracy. The couple divorced in 1967.

Heflin was the grandfather of actor Ben O'Brien and actress Eleanor O'Brien.  Van Heflin's sister, Fran, nickname 'Fra', regularly appeared as Mona Kane, mother of Erica, in the daytime television drama series All My Children.  She played the role from January 5, 1970 until her death in June 1994.  He was also the uncle of Marta Heflin and Mady Kaplan, both actresses, and director Jonathan Kaplan. Heflin's brother, Martin, a public relations executive, was married to American theatre producer Julia Heflin.

Death
On June 6, 1971, Heflin had a heart attack while swimming in a pool. Medics took him to a hospital, and though he lived for nearly seven weeks, he apparently never regained consciousness. Van Heflin died at Cedars of Lebanon Hospital in Los Angeles on July 23, 1971 at 6:43 am, aged 62. He had left instructions forbidding a public funeral. Instead, his cremated remains were scattered in the ocean.

Recognition
In 1960, Heflin was honored with two stars on the Hollywood Walk of Fame, for his contributions to motion pictures at 6311 Hollywood Boulevard, and for television at 6125 Hollywood Boulevard. He was inducted into the Oklahoma Hall of Fame in 1964.

In February 2016, a biography, Van Heflin A Life in Film, by Derek Sculthorpe, was published by McFarland & Co., Inc., of Jefferson, N.C.

Filmography

Television credits

Radio appearances

References

Further reading
Sculthorpe, Derek (2016). Van Heflin: A Life in Film. Jefferson, North Carolina: McFarland.

External links
Van Heflin A Life in Film 

Encyclopedia of Oklahoma History and Culture – Heflin, Van
Photographs and literature on Van Hefln

1908 births
1971 deaths
20th-century American male actors
American male film actors
American male radio actors
American male stage actors
Best Supporting Actor Academy Award winners
Classen School of Advanced Studies alumni
First Motion Picture Unit personnel
Male Spaghetti Western actors
Male Western (genre) film actors
Male actors from Oklahoma
Metro-Goldwyn-Mayer contract players
People from Walters, Oklahoma
RKO Pictures contract players
United States Army Air Forces officers
University of Oklahoma alumni